Fezokuhle Brian Zomakahle Mbatha (born 2 August 1999) is a South African rugby union player for the  in Super Rugby and in the Currie Cup and the  in the Rugby Challenge. His regular position is hooker.

References

External links
 

South African rugby union players
Living people
1999 births
People from Empangeni
Rugby union hookers
Sharks (rugby union) players
South Africa Under-20 international rugby union players
Sharks (Currie Cup) players
Rugby union players from KwaZulu-Natal